is a railway station in the city of Uozu, Toyama, Japan, operated by the private railway operator Toyama Chihō Railway.

Lines

Station layout 
The station has one ground-level island platform serving two tracks connected by an underground passage. The station is staffed.

Platforms

History
Shin-Uozu Station was opened on 21 August 1936.

Adjacent stations

Passenger statistics
In fiscal 2015, the station was used by 1440 passengers daily.

Surrounding area 
Uozu City Hall
Ainokaze Toyama Railway Line Uozu Station

See also
 List of railway stations in Japan

References

External links

 

Railway stations in Toyama Prefecture
Railway stations in Japan opened in 1936
Stations of Toyama Chihō Railway
Uozu, Toyama